Khang may refer to:
Khang people, a people of northwestern Vietnam
Kháng language
Khang, Iran (disambiguation), places in Iran